In Greek mythology, the name Butes (Ancient Greek: Βούτης, Boútēs) referred to several different people.

Butes, an Athenian prince as the son of King Pandion I and the naiad Zeuxippe. He was a priest of Poseidon and Athena and was worshipped as a hero by the Athenians. He was married to Chthonia, daughter of his brother Erechtheus. Butes other siblings were Philomela, Procne and possibly Teuthras.
Butes, an Argonaut, son of Teleon and Zeuxippe (daughter of Eridanus). In some accounts, his father was called Aeneus. When the Argonauts were sailing past the Sirens, he was the only one who was unable resist the charm of their singing, swimming off to them. But Aphrodite saved Butes by transferring him to Lilybaeum in Sicily, where he became her lover. Other accounts call him a famous bee keeper and a native Sicilian king. He was the father of Eryx by Aphrodite, and also of Polycaon.
Butes, a Thracian, Boreas's son, who was hostile towards his stepbrother Lycurgus and was driven out of the country by him. He settled in the island of Strongyle (Naxos) with a bunch of men, and proceeded to attack those who sailed past the island. As there were no women on Strongyle to begin with, they would sail here and there to seize some from the land, but were not quite successful. When they landed in Thessaly for that purpose, Butes offended Dionysus by raping Coronis, a Maenad, and was made insane upon her imploration, in which state he threw himself down a well and died. His companions did abduct some women, including Iphimedeia and her daughter Pancratis.
Butes, possible father of Hippodamia (wife of Pirithous). She is otherwise referred to as daughter of Atrax or Adrastus
Butes, son of Pallas and brother of Clytus; the two brothers were younger companions of Cephalus.
Butes, a member of the clan of Amycus, from Bithynia, who, despite being a champion wrestler, was killed by Dares in a boxing match.
Butes, a warrior in the army of the Seven against Thebes killed by Haemon.
Butes, a servant of Anchises.
Butes, a warrior who fought under Aeneas and was killed by Camilla.

Notes

References 

 Apollodorus, The Library with an English Translation by Sir James George Frazer, F.B.A., F.R.S. in 2 Volumes, Cambridge, MA, Harvard University Press; London, William Heinemann Ltd. 1921. ISBN 0-674-99135-4. Online version at the Perseus Digital Library. Greek text available from the same website.
Diodorus Siculus, The Library of History translated by Charles Henry Oldfather. Twelve volumes. Loeb Classical Library. Cambridge, Massachusetts: Harvard University Press; London: William Heinemann, Ltd. 1989. Vol. 3. Books 4.59–8. Online version at Bill Thayer's Web Site
 Diodorus Siculus, Bibliotheca Historica. Vol 1-2. Immanel Bekker. Ludwig Dindorf. Friedrich Vogel. in aedibus B. G. Teubneri. Leipzig. 1888–1890. Greek text available at the Perseus Digital Library.
 Gaius Julius Hyginus, Fabulae from The Myths of Hyginus translated and edited by Mary Grant. University of Kansas Publications in Humanistic Studies. Online version at the Topos Text Project.
 Maurus Servius Honoratus, In Vergilii carmina comentarii. Servii Grammatici qui feruntur in Vergilii carmina commentarii; recensuerunt Georgius Thilo et Hermannus Hagen. Georgius Thilo. Leipzig. B. G. Teubner. 1881. Online version at the Perseus Digital Library.
 The Orphic Argonautica, translated by Jason Colavito. © Copyright 2011. Online version at the Topos Text Project.
Publius Ovidius Naso, Metamorphoses translated by Brookes More (1859-1942). Boston, Cornhill Publishing Co. 1922. Online version at the Perseus Digital Library.
 Publius Ovidius Naso, Metamorphoses. Hugo Magnus. Gotha (Germany). Friedr. Andr. Perthes. 1892. Latin text available at the Perseus Digital Library.
 Publius Ovidius Naso, The Epistles of Ovid. London. J. Nunn, Great-Queen-Street; R. Priestly, 143, High-Holborn; R. Lea, Greek-Street, Soho; and J. Rodwell, New-Bond-Street. 1813. Online version at the Perseus Digital Library.
 Publius Papinius Statius, The Thebaid translated by John Henry Mozley. Loeb Classical Library Volumes. Cambridge, MA, Harvard University Press; London, William Heinemann Ltd. 1928. Online version at the Topos Text Project.
 Publius Papinius Statius, The Thebaid. Vol I-II. John Henry Mozley. London: William Heinemann; New York: G.P. Putnam's Sons. 1928. Latin text available at the Perseus Digital Library.
 Publius Vergilius Maro, Aeneid. Theodore C. Williams. trans. Boston. Houghton Mifflin Co. 1910. Online version at the Perseus Digital Library.
 Publius Vergilius Maro, Bucolics, Aeneid, and Georgics. J. B. Greenough. Boston. Ginn & Co. 1900. Latin text available at the Perseus Digital Library.

Argonauts
Ancient Athenian priests
Consorts of Aphrodite
Greek mythological heroes
Characters in the Aeneid
Sicilian characters in Greek mythology
Attican characters in Greek mythology
Characters in the Argonautica
Mythological rapists